Hofkirchen an der Trattnach is a municipality in the district of Grieskirchen in the Austrian state of Upper Austria.

Geography
Hofkirchen lies in the Hausruckviertel. About 12 percent of the municipality is forest, and 79 percent is farmland.

References

Cities and towns in Grieskirchen District